Yakutpura railway station is a railway station in Hyderabad, Telangana, India. Localities like Yakutpura Colony, Saidabad, Santosh Nagar, Madannapet, Pisal Banda, Rein Bazar, Edi Bazar and Brahman Vaadi are accessible from this station.

Lines
Hyderabad Multi-Modal Transport System
Falaknuma–Secunderabad route

External links
MMTS Timings as per South Central Railway

MMTS stations in Hyderabad
Hyderabad railway division